St. Pius X Catholic Church is a registered historic building in Cincinnati, Ohio, listed in the National Register on December 4, 1978.  Located along Blue Rock Street, it was dedicated in 1879 to St. Patrick, and then in 1991 was dedicated to Pope Pius X by the Society of St. Pius X. Beginning in 2015, the building now houses a brewery, Urban Artifact.

Historic uses 
Religious Structure

Notes

External links

Official website 
Documentation from the University of Cincinnati

National Register of Historic Places in Cincinnati
Churches on the National Register of Historic Places in Ohio
Romanesque Revival church buildings in Ohio
Roman Catholic churches in Cincinnati